Ada Hantu is a 2021 Malaysian Malay-language horror comedy film directed by Hairul Azreen. It tells the story of Aliff's unforgettable birthday celebration trip in an abandoned house previously occupied by Japanese Military. The film is the directorial debut of Azreen and was released on 13 August 2021 on Disney+ Hotstar.

Synopsis 
Five friends Aliff, Bariah, Talha, Sasha & Jimmy planned to celebrate ALIFF's birthday in a banglo left abandoned by Japanese Army. Aliff, a renowned YouTuber, gets excited about the idea despite being hesitant and scared.

As the night goes deep, Aliff feels more uncomfortable with the creepy atmosphere of the house. Several disturbances awoken him in the middle of the night. He is not aware these are the birthday pranks by his friends.

Aliff can't stand the fear and bolts towards the door, wanting to leave this haunted place, however, the chandelier in the living room drops and hits him. To everyone's surprise, Aliff is dead.

Cast 
 Zahiril Adzim as Aliff
 Shiqin Kamal as Bariah
 Hairul Azreen as Talha
 Nafiez Zaidi as Jimmy
 Elvina Chua as Sasha
 Sophia Albarakbah as Farah
 Theebaan G as Suresh
 Henley Hii as Peter
 Dafi Ismail Sabri as Amir

References

External links 
 
 海鲁阿兹林当导演，许亮宇义气相挺
 Kini Bergelar Pengarah, Hairul Azreen Bakal Tampil Dengan Filem ‘Ada Hantu’

2021 films
2021 horror films
2020s Malayalam-language films
Malay-language films
Malaysian horror films
2020s English-language films